Pseudochromis alticaudex, the spot-breast dottyback, is a species of ray-finned fish from the Western Pacific: the east part of Indonesia, Papua New Guinea and the Solomon Islands, and is a member of the family Pseudochromidae.

References

alticaudex
Taxa named by Anthony C. Gill
Fish described in 2004
Fish of the Pacific Ocean